The assistant secretary for health (ASH) is a senior U.S. government official within the United States Department of Health and Human Services (HHS). The position is a statutory office and the holder of the office serves as the United States Secretary of Health and Human Services's primary advisor on matters involving the nation's public health. The assistant secretary oversees all matters pertaining to the United States Public Health Service (PHS), the main division of the Department of Health and Human Services, for the secretary, and provides strategic and policy direction. The Public Health Service comprises almost all of the agency divisions of the Department of Health and Human Services including the United States Public Health Service Commissioned Corps, one of the eight federal uniformed services, comprising more than 6,500 uniformed health professionals who serve with the Department of Health and Human Services, or are assigned to work within other federal agencies, including the United States Armed Forces.

The assistant secretary is a civilian or a uniformed officer of the commissioned corps and is nominated for appointment by the president. The nominee must also be confirmed via majority by the Senate. The assistant secretary serves at the pleasure of the president. Appointees who are a serving uniformed officer of the commissioned corps, by statute, are appointed as a four-star admiral and is the highest ranking officer in the commissioned corps, as no other position in the Public Health Service is designated as a four-star office. The president may also nominate a civilian appointee to also be appointed a direct commission in the commissioned corps if the nominee so chooses. The assistant secretary's office and its staff make up the Office of the Assistant Secretary for Health (OASH). The current assistant secretary for health is Admiral Rachel Levine.

History
The Office of the Assistant Secretary for Health and Scientific Affairs was established on January 1, 1967, following Reorganization Plan No. 3 of 1966. The plan allowed the Secretary of Health, Education, and Welfare to restructure the Public Health Service to better serve public health. The office was renamed the Office of the Assistant Secretary for Health following the Department of Education Organization Act in 1972.

Office of the Assistant Secretary for Health 

As of 2018, the Office of the Assistant Secretary for Health oversees 12 core public health offices, 10 regional health offices, and 10 presidential and secretarial advisory committees.  Prior to 2010, the office was known as the Office of Public Health and Science.

List of Assistant Secretaries for Health

References

External links
 Office of the Assistant Secretary for Health (ASH)
 Office of the Assistant Secretary for Health - Leadership

 
United States Department of Health and Human Services
United States Public Health Service